McNeil or MacNeil is a Scottish surname of Irish origin closely related to the Gaelic speaking Isle of Barra in the Hebrides. Notable people with the surname include:

People

Actors and models
Catherine McNeil (born 1989), Australian model
Claudia McNeil (1917–1993), American actress
Kate McNeil (born 1959), American television actress
Nancy McNeil (born 1947), American model in Playboy magazine
Scott McNeil, Australian-Canadian voice actor

Military personnel
Clarence H. McNeil (1873–1947), American general in the United States Army
John McNeil (1813–1891), American general in the Union Army during the Civil War
John McNeil Jr. (1784–1850), American general in the United States Army
John McNeill (British Army officer) (1831–1904), British major-general and recipient of the Victoria Cross
Joseph McNeil (born 1942), American general in the United States Air Force and member of the Greensboro Four

Musicians and singers
Albert J. McNeil (1920–2022), American choral conductor and ethnomusicologist
Dennis McNeil (born 1960), American operatic tenor, musical theater performer and concert singer
John McNeil (musician) (born 1948), American jazz musician
Megan McNeil (1990–2011), Canadian singer
Suzie McNeil (born 1976), Canadian vocalist, contestant on Rock Star: INXS

Politicians
David B. McNeil (1818–1897), American politician in New York state
D. C. McNeil (1927–2015), Canadian politician
Duncan McNeil (born 1950), Scottish politician
Francis J. McNeil (born 1932), American ambassador to Costa Rica
Hector McNeil (1907–1955), Scottish politician
James McNeil (born 1958), American businessman and politician
Luis Anderson McNeil (born 1941), Panamanian politician, Minister of Labor
Margo McNeil (born 1948), American politician from Missouri
Mary McNeil, Canadian politician
Myron S. McNeil (1873–1944), American politician and state senator from Mississippi
Raymond J. McNeil (1932-2021), American politician, Army Veteran, World traveler and Head Harris
Ron McNeil (1920–2003), Canadian politician
Stephen McNeil (born 1964), Canadian politician, 28th premier of Nova Scotia
William McNeil (1906–1964), Australian politician

Sportspeople

Baseball
Jeff McNeil (born 1992), American baseball player for the New York Mets
Norm McNeil (1892–1942), American professional baseball catcher, played briefly with the Boston Red Sox

Football (soccer)
Andrew McNeil (born 1987), Scottish football coach and former football goalkeeper
Bob McNeil (1890–1948), Scottish footballer for Hamilton Academical and Chelsea
Bobby McNeil (born 1962), Scottish footballer for Hull City, Lincoln City, Preston North End and Carlisle United
Charlie McNeil (footballer) (1963–2016), Scottish footballer
Dave McNeil (1921–1993), English footballer
David McNeil (footballer) (born 1995), Scottish footballer
Dixie McNeil (born 1947), English former footballer and manager
Donald McNeil (footballer) (born 1958), Scottish footballer
Dwight McNeil (born 1999), English footballer
Henry McNeil (1853–1924), Scottish footballer for Queen's Park and Scotland
Hugh McNeil (1878–1960), Scottish footballer for Motherwell, Celtic, Morton and Hamilton Academical
Hugh McNeil Jr (fl. 1920s), son of the above, Scottish footballer for Motherwell and Hamilton Academical
John McNeil (footballer, born 1959), Scottish former footballer primarily with Morton
Johnny McNeil (fl. 1930s), Scottish footballer and manager
Mark McNeil (born 1962), English former footballer
Martin McNeil (born 1980), Scottish former footballer
Matt McNeil (1927–1977), Scottish footballer
Matty McNeil (born 1976), English former footballer
Mick McNeil (born 1940), English former footballer
Moses McNeil (1855–1938), Scottish footballer for Rangers (founding member of the club) and Scotland
Peter McNeil (footballer) (1854–1901), Scottish footballer for Rangers (founding member of the club)

Gridiron football
Charlie McNeil (American football) (1936–1994), American defensive back in gridiron football
Clifton McNeil (born 1940), American former wide receiver in gridiron football
Douglas McNeil (born 1988), American wide receiver in gridiron football
Emanuel McNeil (born 1967), American former defensive tackle in gridiron football
Frank McNeil (1909–1971), American football player for the Brooklyn Dodgers
Freeman McNeil (born 1959), American former running back in gridiron football
Gerald McNeil (born 1962), German-born American former wide receiver in gridiron football
Jay McNeil (born 1970), Canadian former offensive lineman in gridiron football
Pat McNeil (born 1954), American former running back in gridiron football
Raymond McNeil (born 1984), American offensive lineman in gridiron football
Ryan McNeil (American football) (born 1970), American former defensive back in gridiron football
Thomas H. McNeil (1860–1932), American quarterback in gridiron football and lawyer

Ice hockey
George McNeil (ice hockey) (1914–1997), Canadian ice hockey player and coach
Gerry McNeil (1926–2004), Canadian ice hockey goaltender

Other
Alastair McNeil (1915–1944), Scottish international rugby union player
Calum McNeil (born 1966), Scottish wrestler
Charles K. McNeil (1903–1981), American inventor of the point spread in sports gambling
Colin McNeil (born 1972), Scottish former professional boxer
Hector McNeil (footballer) (1901–1969), Australian rules footballer
Jeremy McNeil (born 1980), American former basketball player for Syracuse University
Jimmy McNeil (? – c. 2003), Scottish rugby union player
Jye McNeil (born 1994), Australian jockey
Lachlan McNeil (born 2001) Australian rules footballer
Loretta McNeil (1907–1988), American athlete and Olympic sprinter
Lori McNeil (born 1963), American tennis coach and former player
Pablo McNeil (1939–2011), Jamaican track and field sprinter and sprinting coach
Sally McNeil (born 1960), American bodybuilder convicted in the shooting death of her husband and fellow bodybuilder, Ray McNeil
Tom McNeil (1929–2020), Australian rules footballer and politician
Vic McNeil (1890–1936), Australian rules footballer

Writers
Baye McNeil, American writer living in Japan
Carla Speed McNeil (born 1969), American sci-fi writer and illustrator
Donald McNeil Jr. (born 1954), American journalist
Florence McNeil (c. 1932–2013), Canadian poet, writer and playwright
Frances McNeil, English novelist and playwright also writing as Frances Brody
Henry Everett McNeil (1862–1929), American writer
Jean McNeil (born 1968), Canadian-born fiction and travel author working in England
Jim McNeil (1935–1982), Australian convict and playwright
Joanne McNeil, American writer, editor and art critic
Legs McNeil (born 1956), American music journalist and founder of Punk magazine
Sacha McNeil, New Zealand journalist and news presenter
Steve McNeil (born 1979), English television presenter, writer and comedian
W. K. McNeil (1940–2005), American folklorist and historian

Other
Anne McNeil (born 1977), American chemist
Barbara Joyce McNeil (born 1941), American physician
Bruce McNeil (1939–2019), American environmental fine arts photographer
Charles McNeil (physician) (1881–1964), Scottish paediatrician
Daniel McNeil (1853–1918), Canadian lawyer and judge
Darrell McNeil (1957–2018), American animator, writer, editor, publisher, producer and actor
Dorothy Blackwell McNeil (born 1940s), American businesswoman
Dudley B. McNeil (1908–1977), American prelate of the Episcopal Church
Fannie Knowling McNeil (1869–1928), Canadian suffragist and artist
George McNeil (artist) (1908–1995), American abstract expressionist painter
Howard McNeil (1920–2010), American meteorologist
Larry McNeil (photographer) (born 1955), American photographer and printmaker
Neil McNeil (1851–1934), Roman Catholic Archbishop of Toronto
Neil McNeil (businessman) (1855–1927), Western Australian businessman 
Neil E. McNeil (1875–?), American attorney and Associate Justice of the Oklahoma Supreme Court
Patricia McNeil, Canadian costume designer and production designer
Peter McNeil (architect) (1917–1989), Canadian architect
Robert L. McNeil Jr. (1915–2010), American chemist and pharmaceutical industry executive

Fictional characters
Michael McNeil, character in Command & Conquer 3: Tiberium Wars played by Michael Biehn
Ryan McNeil, character in The Young and the Restless played by Scott Reeves
Tricia McNeil, character in The Young and the Restless played by Sabryn Genet

As first or middle name
Mcneil Clarke (1838–1872), Ontario lawyer and political figure
McNeil Hendricks (born 1973), South African former rugby union player
McNeil Moore (born 1933), American former defensive back in gridiron football
McNeil Morgan (born 1970), Vincentian cricketer
Joseph Hector McNeil Carruthers (1857–1932), Australian politician, Premier of New South Wales
John McNeil Eddings (1830–1896), American military storekeeper and civic leader
Edward McNeil Farmer (1901–1969), American artist and designer
Richard McNeil Henderson, British engineer and colonial administrator
Adrienne McNeil Herndon (born Adrienne Elizabeth McNeil; 1869–1910), designer of the Herndon Home
Irving McNeil Ives (1896–1962), American politician, Senator from New York
Reed McNeil Izatt (born 1926), American chemist
Ryan McNeil Lamswood (born 2000), Canadian curler
James McNeil Stephenson (1796–1877), American lawyer, businessman and politician
Keith McNeil Campbell-Walter (1904–1976), British admiral
John McNeil Wilmot (1755–1847), Canadian businessman, judge and political figure in New Brunswick
Leone McNeil Zimmer (1916–2014), American stained glass artist

See also 
MacNeil
MacNeill
MacNeille
McNeal
MacNeal
McNeill (disambiguation)

Scottish surnames
Scottish Gaelic-language surnames
Patronymic surnames
Surnames from given names